John Power Howden (December 5, 1879 – November 4, 1959) was a Canadian Member of Parliament and physician.

Howden was born in Perth, Ontario. When he was 12, his family moved to Manitoba  where he attended public school in Winnipeg and earned his medical degree at the University of Manitoba before establishing his practice in St. Boniface, Manitoba.

He became active in community life and was elected mayor of St. Boniface serving in the position from 1916 to 1917.

A Liberal, he was first elected to the House of Commons of Canada in the 1925 federal election  as the Member of Parliament for St. Boniface and was re-elected in four subsequent elections and served in the House of Commons for two decades, until April 1945 when he was appointed to the Senate of Canada by William Lyon Mackenzie King.

Howden served in the upper house until his death in 1959 several months after suffering from a stroke.

Electoral history

References

External links
Manitoba Historical Society biography
 

1879 births
1959 deaths
Physicians from Ontario
Liberal Party of Canada MPs
Members of the House of Commons of Canada from Manitoba
Canadian senators from Manitoba
Liberal Party of Canada senators
Mayors of Saint Boniface, Winnipeg